Pete Oswald (born July 8, 1980) is a #1 New York Times bestselling illustrator and production designer, best known for The Angry Birds Movie film series and ParaNorman. He is also known for his work as a children's book author and illustrator, and painter. Pete's work includes the #1 New York Times bestselling picture book, The Good Egg, and the #2 New York Times bestselling picture book, The Bad Seed, both part of the Food Group series written by Jory John.

Early life and education 
Oswald was raised in Bountiful, Utah, the son of Christopher and Nedda Oswald. His mother, also an artist, encouraged him to begin painting and drawing from an early age. He attended Judge Memorial High School, where he played baseball and basketball, in Salt Lake City, Utah.

After graduating high school in 1999, he relocated to Los Angeles where he enrolled in Loyola Marymount University and earned a degree in animation arts. He then began working in Los Angeles in film and television animation.

He cites his artistic influences as Pablo Picasso, Claude Monet, Gustav Klimt, Miroslav Šašek, Charles and Ray Eames, Mary Blair, Ronald Searle, and Al Hirschfeld.

Career 
Oswald is the illustrator of The Smart Cookie; The Couch Potato; The Cool Bean; The Good Egg;The Bad Seed, And The Alderweireld Book written by Jory John.  The Bad Seed was described by The New York Times as "kid-book humor at its best, both warmhearted and frisky — the kind that leaves adults, too, cracking up and grateful". The bestselling duo also created That’s What Dinosaurs Do together. Pete's author debut, Hike, was shortlisted for the CILIP Kate Greenaway Medal. He co-created the children's book Mingo the Flamingo

Oswald has served in production design and the art department on multiple animated family studio films and television shows. He is best known for his work on the 2016 film The Angry Birds Movie, for which he transformed the characters, lighting, and set design from the popular mobile game into an animated feature film series over four years. He was noted for his work on The Angry Birds Movie in Vice's The Creator's Project, which stated: "Pete Oswald's fingerprints are all over the cutting edge of animated feature films, marked by a bright, colorful, slightly angular style." In 2016, he appeared at Comic-Con in San Diego, California. In 2017, he began working on The Angry Birds Movie 2.

He served as a visual artist on the popular animated films Madagascar: Escape 2 Africa, Cloudy with a Chance of Meatballs, Cloudy with a Chance of Meatballs 2, ParaNorman, Hotel Transylvania, and The Lego Ninjago Movie.

He also paints with acrylics, in addition to his animation and illustration work, and debuted his painting series Pacific Abstract, inspired by the California coast, at a pop-up art gallery show at Bergamot Station in Santa Monica, California, in 2016.

Filmography

Film

Television

Awards and nominations 

|-
| 2009
| The Story of Walls
|  Annie Award for Best Animated Short
| 
|-
| 2011
| Doubtsourcing
|  Annie Award for Production Design in an Animated Television Production
| 
|-
| 2013
| ParaNorman
| Annie Award for Production Design in an Animated Feature Production
| 

|-
|}

References

External links 
 

1980 births
Living people
American production designers
American animators
American animated film directors
American children's book illustrators
20th-century American painters
Loyola Marymount University alumni
21st-century American painters